Jayda Coleman (born September 27, 2001) is an American college softball player for the Oklahoma Sooners. She also represented the United States at the 2019 U-19 Women's Softball World Cup and USA Softball International Cup.

High school career
Coleman attended The Colony High School in The Colony, Texas. During her high school career she was a six-time All-State honoree and three-time All-American. During the 2017 season, she hit .653 with 12 home runs and 81 hits in 40 games, and she led the Dallas-Fort Worth area with 74 runs scored and 53 stolen bases as The Colony won the Class 5A state championship. Following the season she was named MaxPreps National Freshman of the Year. 

During her senior year, she batted .717 with 42 runs scored, 41 steals, 29 RBI and 10 triples. She also was 12–0 in the circle with a 0.89 ERA and 75 strikeouts in 55 innings of work before the season was canceled due to the COVID-19 pandemic. Following the season, she was named the 2019–20 Gatorade Softball Player of the Year. She finished her career with a .702 batting average, 279 career hits, 261 runs, and 209 stolen bases and holds the state record for most runs all-time in the Dallas area. She was the consensus No. 1 recruit in her class.

College career
Coleman began her collegiate career for the Oklahoma Sooners in 2021. Coleman was named the Big 12 Player of the Week for the week ending May 11, 2021. She finished the weekend batting .625 with six RBIs, one home run, one double and nine putouts from centerfield. She finished the season with a .478 batting average, with 46 RBI, 66 runs scored, 31 walks, eight home runs and 19 stolen bases, with a team-best .584 on-base percentage. Her on-base percentage and stolen bases ranked first in the Big 12 and she was second behind her teammate Tiare Jennings in runs scored and batting average. She ranked in the top 10 nationally in runs per game (3rd), doubles (4th) on-base percentage (5th) and batting average (8th). 

During game three of the championships series at the 2021 Women's College World Series, Coleman was 2-for-3 with a home run and three RBI to help the Sooners win the national championship. Following an outstanding season she was named first team All-Big 12, all-Big 12 Freshman team, and first team All-American. She was also named a top-three finalist for NFCA National Freshman of the Year.

During her sophomore year in 2022, she batted .429, with seven home runs, 37 RBIs, a .590 on-base percentage and led the team with 13 stolen bases. Her .590 on-base percentage ranked third in the NCAA. In the field, she had a perfect 1.000 fielding percentage with 32 putouts and three assists. During conference play, she held a conference-best on-base percentage of .614 with 17 walks, four stolen bases and 21 runs, including one home run, two doubles and eight RBIs. Following the season she was named a first-team All-American.

International career
Coleman represented the United States at the 2019 U-19 Women's Softball World Cup. She was one of only two high-school athletes on the team and posted a .522 batting average with 12 hits, six runs, four RBIs, and won gold. She also represented the United States at the 2019 USA Softball International Cup where she posted a .375 batting average with one home run, five RBI, six runs scored, and won bronze.

Personal life
Coleman was born to Deana and Cedric Coleman, and has two siblings, Ashley Wilkerson and Jhanna Coleman. Her mother competed collegiately at Texas Woman's University, while her father competed collegiately at North Central Texas College.

References

2001 births
Living people
Oklahoma Sooners softball players
People from The Colony, Texas
Softball players from Texas